JD Squared, Inc. is an American manufacturer of tube and pipe benders.  Founded in 1982 and based in Johnson City, Tennessee, the company has manufactured fabrication tools since 1982, starting with tube and pipe benders and later expanding to other fabrication tools.  JD Squared is a privately owned Florida corporation.  Robert Hughes is the owner and Chief Engineer.

History
JD Squared, Inc. was founded under the name Hughes Performance Engineering in 1982. In 1983 they designed and released the Model 1 tube bender. The Model 1 Bender became popular because it was one of the few affordable manual tube benders on the fabricating market. However, the Model 1 Bender could only bend 90 degrees. In 1988 JD Squared released the Model 2 Tube bender with 180 degree bend capability. In 1992 the company changed its name to JD Squared, Inc. and released the Model 3 Tube Bender.

Products
Tools currently  manufactured by JD Squared include the Model 3 Tube Bender, the Model 4 Tube Bender, Model 32 Bender, Model 54 Rotary Bender, TN-100 Tube Notcher, the Notch Master Tube Notcher, Beast Tube Notcher, Dr. Jig Chassis Jig, and CNC Plasma Tables.

See also
Tube and pipe benders

External links
JD Squared,Inc.
JD Squared Australia

Manufacturing companies based in Tennessee
Manufacturing companies based in Florida
Marion County, Florida
Johnson City, Tennessee
American companies established in 1982
Manufacturing companies established in 1982
1982 establishments in Tennessee
Valve manufacturers